The Spache readability formula is a readability test for writing in English, designed by George Spache. It works best on texts that are for children up to fourth grade. For older children, the Dale–Chall readability formula is more appropriate.

It was introduced in 1953 in Spache's "A new readability formula for primary-grade reading materials," (The Elementary School Journal, 53, 410–413), and has subsequently been revised.

Calculation
The method compares words in a text to a set list of everyday words. The number of words per sentence and the percentage of unfamiliar words determine the reading age.

The original formula was: 

The revised formula is:

Further reading

 Clarence R. Stone. "Measuring Difficulty of Primary Reading Material: A Constructive Criticism of Spache's Measure." The Elementary School Journal, Vol. 57, No. 1 (Oct. 1956), pp. 36–41

Readability tests